Nell Gwynn is a play by the British playwright Jessica Swale, begun in 2013 and premiering at Shakespeare's Globe from 19 September to 17 October 2015. It deals with the life of Nell Gwynn, mistress of Charles II, and her part in the theatre of the 17th century. Gugu Mbatha-Raw played the title role in the production debut.

Plot
Hearing Nell Gwynn heckle at the playhouse, Charles Hart decides to train her as an actress, just before women are first allowed on the London stage—the pair also become lovers. When Charles II grants permission for women to act, Nell joins Hart in the King's Company. Her admission to the Company is backed by its writer John Dryden, director Thomas Killigrew, and most of the actors except Edward Kynaston, who had previously played the company's female parts. Charles II continues his affair with Lady Castlemaine although his queen Catherine objects. Soon afterwards Charles sees Nell onstage and is greatly attracted to her. He visits her backstage and the pair begin an affair, which eventually leads to a rupture between her and Hart.

Nell also faces threats from Lady Castlemaine and from Charles's chief minister Arlington, who try to get her to give up Charles, or to choose between him and the theatre. These culminate in a violent attack on Nell's sister Rose, instigated by Arlington. Instead of giving up Charles, Nell moves into apartments provided by the king. She is visited by her sister Rose and their mother Ma Gwynn. Nell attends fewer rehearsals, leading to tensions with the Company. A French diplomatic party arrives and Arlington orchestrates Charles into taking Louise de Kéroualle as his mistress. When Charles and de Kéroualle attend the theatre, Nell publicly pokes fun at the French woman.

Rose visits Nell at court alone to announce Ma's death and berate Nell for not visiting them. On Nell's advice Charles dissolves the Exclusion Bill Parliament, including Arlington. Nell takes her revenge by having him appointed as the royal dog-walker. Nell and Charles live together happily, but Charles suffers an apoplectic fit (stroke) whilst they are playing croquet, dying soon afterwards. Nell is excluded from his deathbed. Soon afterwards, she decides to return to King's Company full-time, reconcile with Hart and appear in Dryden's Tyrannick Love. As she is out of practice, she gives the lead role to Kynaston, but insists on speaking an epilogue which she writes; it closes both Dryden's and Swale's plays.

Cast and characters

Production
Playwright Jessica Swale and star Gugu Mbatha-Raw were long-term friends before making the play. The play courted controversy because Mbatha-Raw, a mixed-race woman, was cast to play Nell Gwynn, a historical white figure. Playwright Swale defended the choice saying, "It's sort of frustrating that the question comes up, but I think it's really important to say that it's not a factor." Mbatha-Raw expressed frustration with the issue of her race being raised, saying, "I've played Juliet and she's supposed to be Italian, and I'm not Italian, and I've played Ophelia and she was in theory Danish. I think with theatre hopefully if you have the essence of a person it doesn't matter so much what you look like." Mbatha-Raw was nominated for Best Actress at the 2015 Evening Standard Theatre Awards for the role.

The premiere production transferred to the Apollo Theatre, where it played from 4 February to 30 April 2016, with the lead role taken over by Gemma Arterton. The play was revived as a touring production by English Touring Theatre in 2017 with Laura Pitt-Pulford as Nell, including a run at Shakespeare's Globe in May.

Original director Christopher Luscombe helmed the US premiere of the play at the Chicago Shakespeare Theater from 20 September to 4 November 2018. The cast consisted of both local Chicago actors and veteran West End actors Scarlett Strallen as Nell Gwynn and David Bedella as Edward Kynaston.

In 2019, Robert Richmond directed the East Coast premiere at Folger Theatre (January 29 - March 10) in a production that featured Broadway's Alison Luff as Nell Gwynn, Quinn Franzen as Charles Hart, and R. J. Foster as King Charles II.

Awards and nominations

Original West End Production

References

2015 plays
Plays set in the 17th century
Plays set in London
Biographical plays
British plays
West End plays
Nell Gwyn
Cultural depictions of Charles II of England
Cultural depictions of Barbara Palmer, 1st Duchess of Cleveland
Cultural depictions of Louise de Kérouaille, Duchess of Portsmouth
Cultural depictions of Catherine of Braganza